The 2019 Mr. Olympia contest was a weekend long IFBB professional bodybuilding competition that was held on September 12 to 14, 2019, in Las Vegas, Nevada. This was the 55th Mr. Olympia competition celebrated. The weekend competition is also known as the Joe Weider's Olympia Fitness and Performance Weekend. While the main event was the competition for the title of Mr. Olympia, several other events were held which includes the Amateur competition and sports expo.

On September 12, 2019, a press conference was held on Orleans Arena.

On September 13, 2019, prejudging and finals for Fitness Olympia, Figure Olympia and Classic Physique were held and livestream via Amazon Prime. Mr. Olympia pre-judging was also held on the same night.

On September 14, 2019, the Men's Physique Olympia and Women's Physique Olympia judging and finals were held in the morning at Las Vegas Convention Center. At night, the Bikini Olympia, 212 Olympia and Mr. Olympia finals were held at Orleans Arena.

On September 16, 2019, an Olympia Superstar Seminar was held.

Shawn Rhoden, the previous year Mr Olympia 2018, was not allowed to compete due to legal reasons, so there was no defending champion this year.

Brandon Curry won his first Mr Olympia title.

Results

Other results
 Raymont Edmonds won the Men's Physique Olympia title dethroning Brandon Hendrickson.
 Shanique Grant won the Women's Physique Olympia title.
 Chris Bumstead won the Classic Physique title for the first time dethroning Breon Ansley.
 Whitney Jones won Fitness Olympia title.
 Cydney Gillon won the 2019 Figure Olympia title for the third consecutive time.
Elisa Pecini won 2019 Bikini Olympia dethroning Angelica Teixeira.

References

External links
 Official website (archived)

Mr. Olympia
2019 in bodybuilding
Mr. Olympia
Mr. Olympia 2019